Lee-Anne Pace (born 15 February 1981) is a South African professional golfer.

Career
Pace was born in Paarl, Western Cape. She had a successful amateur collegiate career in the United States, where she attended Murray State University and the University of Tulsa, graduating with a degree in psychology.

Having turned professional in 2005, Pace played on the second tier Duramed Futures Tour in 2006 before qualifying for the LPGA Tour for 2007 at qualifying school. Having lost her card in the United States at the end of 2007, she qualified for the Ladies European Tour for 2008 via qualifying school. She made her breakthrough in 2010 with five wins at the Deutsche Bank Ladies Swiss Open, the S4C Wales Ladies Championship of Europe, the Finnair Masters, the Sanya Ladies Open, and the Suzhou Taihu Ladies Open. She ended the season at the top of the Order of Merit and won the LET Player of the Year.

After failing to win in 2012, Pace had another big season in 2013. Pace won her sixth Ladies European Tour event in May when she took a one stroke victory at the Turkish Airlines Ladies Open. She followed that victory up with another in July, again winning by a stroke, at the Open De España Femenino. She concluded the 2013 season by winning in a playoff at the Sanya Ladies Open. The victory was her eighth on tour and netted her a second LET Player of the Year award. In October 2014, Pace would win her ninth LET event when she was victorious in her home country, winning the Cell C South African Women's Open, in a playoff, after a final round comeback. A week later, Pace won her first LPGA Tour event at the Blue Bay LPGA in China.

Amateur wins
2003 Ohio Valley Conference Championship
2005 Western Athletic Conference Championship

Professional wins (23)

LPGA Tour wins (1)

Ladies European Tour wins (11)

Sunshine Ladies Tour (14)
2015 (1) Investec Ladies Cup
2015 (4) South African Women's Open1, Investec Ladies Cup, Ladies Tshwane Open, SuperSport Ladies Challenge
2016 (2) Cape Town Ladies Open, Joburg Ladies Open
2017 (2) South African Women's Open, Chase to Investec Cup Final
2018 (1) Cape Town Ladies Open
2019 (1) Dimension Data Ladies Challenge
2020 (1) Cape Town Ladies Open
2021 (1) Investec South African Women's Open1
2022 (1) Investec South African Women's Open1
1Co-sanctioned by the Ladies European Tour

Results in LPGA majors
Results not in chronological order before 2019.

^ The Evian Championship was added as a major in 2013.

CUT = missed the half-way cut
DQ = disqualified
NT = no tournament
T = tied

Summary

Most consecutive cuts made – 7 (2014 Evian – 2016 ANA)
Longest streak of top-10s – 1

Team appearances
Amateur
Espirito Santo Trophy (representing South Africa): 2002, 2004

See also
List of golfers with most Ladies European Tour wins

References

External links

Lee-Anne Pace at the University of Tulsa Golden Hurricane official site

Living people
1981 births
South African female golfers
Murray State Racers women's golfers
Tulsa Golden Hurricane women's golfers
LPGA Tour golfers
Ladies European Tour golfers
South African people of British descent
South African expatriate sportspeople in the United States
Sportspeople from Paarl